An overseas constituency or overseas electoral district is any electoral district located outside of a nation-state's borders but which is recognized by the state's government as a district for the representation of its expatriate (and, technically, military) residents who live within the territory of another nation-state. Such constituencies are often organized in order to engage expatriate or diaspora voters who retain their citizenship.

The overseas constituency is considered different from intra-party primaries (organized and funded entirely by political parties or political party organizations with overseas offices) held overseas for expatriate voters.

Overseas constituencies may perform their votes at diplomatic embassies and consulates of their home nation-state, through absentee voting or through electronic voting (including Internet voting).

Instances of government constituencies

Current

Former

The Cook Islands established provisions for an overseas parliamentary seat in 1981, but abolished it in 2003.

Issues and criticism
The establishment of overseas constituencies has generated concern among some governments over possible infringements to national sovereignty. Notably, the Canadian government of Stephen Harper in 2011 protested at the establishment of such constituencies covering the territory of Canada by France and Tunisia, and publicly declared that voting booths for the upcoming elections for both countries would not be allowed in Canadian territory. However, in 2012, an agreement was reached between the three countries whereby such booths could be located primarily in embassies and consulate offices. Canada was the only nation that opposed being included in the overseas constituencies.

Instances of political party overseas constituencies

United Kingdom
Conservatives Abroad (CA) is the official political organisation and global network of the Conservative Party for British citizens living permanently or temporarily abroad.

Labour International similarly represents overseas Labour Party voters.

The Liberal Democrats has an international branch, Lib Dems Abroad, encompassing some 2000 party members living outside the UK.

United States
Democrats Abroad is an organization which encourages support among U.S. citizens living overseas for the Democratic Party; it has sent a delegation to the Democratic National Convention since 1976 and held its first worldwide party primary in 2008. It is recognized as a "state committee" on par with other statewide committees within U.S. territory.

References

Expatriate voting
Constituencies